Coalport Historic District is a national historic district located at Coalport, Clearfield County, Pennsylvania.  The district includes 41 contributing buildings in Coalport.  The district is a mix of commercial and residential building, with half built between 1860 and 1890.  Notable buildings include the United Methodist Church (1902), L.C. Hegarty and Son Used Cars (1941), Scott Hardware (1880), Bell's Drug Store (1884), Coalport 5&10 (1920), First National Bank (1922), Dixie Theater (1920), Central Hotel (1890), Hugh McNulty Hardware (1875), and V. Stevens Furniture Company (1875).

It was added to the National Register of Historic Places in 1999.

References

Historic districts on the National Register of Historic Places in Pennsylvania
Victorian architecture in Pennsylvania
Clearfield County, Pennsylvania
National Register of Historic Places in Clearfield County, Pennsylvania